The 4 Hours of Silverstone was an endurance motor race held at the Silverstone Circuit near Silverstone, England on 10–11 April 2015, and served as the opening round of the 2015 European Le Mans Series, and the first race under the series' new four-hour format.  The event shared the weekend at Silverstone with the FIA World Endurance Championship's six-hour event.

Qualifying

Qualifying result
Class winners in bold.

Race

Race result
Class winners in bold.

References

Endurance motor racing
Auto races in the United Kingdom
Silverstone, 4 hours
Silverstone, 4 hours